The Wyaldra Creek railway bridge is a heritage-listed former railway bridge that carried the Gwabegar railway line across the Wyaldra Creek at Gulgong, in the Mid-Western Regional Council local government area of New South Wales, Australia. The property was owned by RailCorp, an agency of the Government of New South Wales. It was added to the New South Wales State Heritage Register on 2 April 1999.

The bridge was demolished in 1987.

History 

The bridge was built in 1909 as part of the extension of the railway from Gulgong to Dunedoo. The construction of the bridge was reported to be the main challenge for the contractors building the extension. Numerous difficulties were experienced sinking the bridge cylinders "through the drift sand to a very hard and uneven basalt at the bottom of the creek", and progress was slow, but it was completed by December 1909. The Dunedoo extension was formally opened in December 1910.

Description 
The bridge carried a single-track  railway on an open deck (with transomes). The four shorter approach spans were timber girders. The three  spans were timber trusses of the Howe-type with timber compression diagonals, vertical tension rods and six bays. The piers were timber on concrete bases; at least some of the piers were sheeted.

The bridge was demolished in 1987.

Heritage listing 
The Wyaldra Creek railway bridge was listed on the New South Wales State Heritage Register on 2 April 1999.

See also 

List of railway bridges in New South Wales

References

Attribution

External links 

New South Wales State Heritage Register
Former railway bridges in Australia
Articles incorporating text from the New South Wales State Heritage Register
Bridges completed in 1909
1909 establishments in Australia
1987 disestablishments in Australia
Central Tablelands